Martín Marculeta Barbería (born 24 September 1907 in San Sebastián; died 19 November 1984) was a Spanish association footballer. During his career he played for Real Sociedad (1924–1934) and Atlético de Madrid (1934–1936), earned 15 caps and scored 1 goal for Spain national team in a 7-1 rout against Mexico, an Olympian and played 1934 FIFA World Cup.

Career
Born in San Sebastián, Marculeta began playing youth football with local side Amaikak Mutillak. In 1924, Marculeta joined Real Sociedad where he would play for ten seasons. He was involved in the club's epic 1928 Copa del Rey Final loss to FC Barcelona which required two replays.

1928 Amsterdam Summer Games
He played on the team sent to the 1928 Amsterdam Summer Olympics.

References

External links
 Profile
 

1907 births
1984 deaths
Footballers from San Sebastián
Spanish footballers
Spain international footballers
1934 FIFA World Cup players
Real Sociedad footballers
Atlético Madrid footballers
Olympic footballers of Spain
Footballers at the 1928 Summer Olympics
Spanish football managers
Sporting de Gijón managers
Association football midfielders
Real Unión managers
Real Sociedad managers
La Liga players
La Liga managers
Segunda División managers
Basque Country international footballers